Dimitrije (Serbian Cyrillic: Димитрије) is a masculine given name. Dimitrije is a Serbian variant of a Greek name Demetrius. It may refer to:
 Dimitrije Ljubavić (1519–1564), Serbian Orthodox deacon, humanist, writer and printer
 Patriarch Dimitrije (1846–1930), the first Patriarch of the reunified Serbian Orthodox Church
 Dimitrije Ljotić (1891–1945), Serbian politician
 Dimitrije Mitrinović (1887–1953), Serbian philosopher, poet, revolutionary, mystic, theoretician of modern painting, traveller and cosmopolite
 Dimitrije Tucović (1881–1914), Serbian theorist of the socialist movement, prominent leader and a publisher
 Dimitrije Injac (born 1983), Serbian football midfielder
 Dimitrije Dimitrijević (disambiguation)
 Dimitrije Popović (born 1951), eminent Montenegrin and Croatian painter, sculptor, art critic and philosopher
 Dimitrije Bjelica (born 1935), Serbian (formerly Yugoslav) chess FIDE Master who can be found in the Guinness Book of Records for playing a 312-board simul in Subotica in 1997 (score: +219 −1 =92)
 Dimitrije Avramović (1815–1855), Serbian painter known best for his iconostasis and frescos
 Dimitrije T. Leko (1863–1914), renowned Serbian architect and urbanist
 Dimitrije Bašičević (1921–1987), artist, curator and art critic
 Dimitrije Dimitri Davidovic (born 1944), Belgian of Serbian descent former football player, and a football manager
 Dimitrije Ruvarac (1842–1931), Serbian historian, Orthodox priest, politician and publisher
 Dimitrije Dositej Obradović (1742–1811), Serbian writer, philosopher, dramatist, librettist, linguist, traveler, polyglot and the first minister of education of Serbia
 Dimitrije Banjac (born 1976), Serbian actor and comedian
 Dimitrije Stojaković, birth name of Döme Sztójay (1883–1946), a Hungarian soldier and diplomat of Serb origin
 Dimitrije Đorđević (historian) (1922–2009), widely published historian of Modern European history, especially of the Balkans
 Dimitrije Bogdanović (1930–1986), Serbian historian and member of the Serbian Academy of Sciences and Arts
 Dimitrije Davidović (1789–1838), secretary to Miloš Obrenović I, Prince of Serbia, Minister of Education of the Principality of Serbia, writer, journalist, publisher, historian, diplomatist, and founder of modern Serbian journalism and publishing
 Dimitrije Nešić (1836–1904), mathematician and president of the Serbian Royal Academy
 Dimitrije Bratoglic (1765–1831), painter

See also 
Dimitri (disambiguation)
Dmitry
Dimitrijević
Mitar

Serbian masculine given names